Stanuloviće is a village located in the municipality of Brus, Serbia. As of 2011 census, it has a population of 26 inhabitants.

References

Populated places in Rasina District